The Texas Twister is the debut album by American saxophonist Don Wilkerson recorded in 1960 and released on the Riverside label.

Reception

The Allmusic review by Alex Henderson awarded the album 3 stars and stated "The Texas Twister is recommended to anyone who admires the Lone Star school of soulful, hard-blowing tenor".

Track listing
All compositions by Don Wilkerson except as indicated
 "The Twister" (Cannonball Adderley) - 6:32 
 "Morning Coffee" (Barry Harris) - 7:52 
 "Idiom" (Jim Martin) - 5:21 
 "Jelly Roll" - 7:44 
 "Easy to Love" (Cole Porter) - 4:38 
 "Where or When" (Lorenz Hart, Richard Rodgers) - 4:02 
 "Media" (Martin) - 4:57 
Recorded in San Francisco, California on May 19 (tracks 2, 3 & 7) and May 20 (tracks 1 & 4-6), 1960.

Personnel
Don Wilkerson - tenor saxophone
Nat Adderley - cornet (tracks 1-4 & 7)
Barry Harris - piano
Sam Jones - bass (tracks 1, 4-6)
Leroy Vinnegar - bass (tracks 2, 3, 7)
Billy Higgins - drums

References

Don Wilkerson albums
1960 debut albums
Riverside Records albums
Albums produced by Cannonball Adderley